Griffin Road is a boulevard extending  in Broward County, mostly designated State Road 818 (SR 818). It begins at Orange Drive (U.S. Route 27 or US 27) in Southwest Ranches and continues east to Federal Highway (US 1) in Dania Beach.  The westernmost  of Griffin Road are designated as County Road 818 (CR 818).

Griffin Road serves as a major commuter road for Cooper City, Davie, Hollywood, and Dania Beach in central Broward County, paralleling the South New River Canal for much of its route, and is a primary access road for Fort Lauderdale-Hollywood International Airport.

Route description

CR 818
Griffin Road originates as a locally maintained road, beginning in Everglades Holiday Park in the Everglades Wildlife Management Area adjacent to Weston. providing interchanges with US 27 and Interstate 75 (I-75 and SR 93) in Southwest Ranches

Despite the county designation, some state route shields seem to exist west of SR 823, likely because this segment of Griffin Road was formerly part of the state route. In September 2008, the most recent version of the online FDOT county highway map, State Road 818 formerly extended further west, terminating just west of the I-75 interchange. At the US 27 intersection, Griffin Road is signed as "TO SR 818."

SR 818
State Road 818 begins at the Flamingo Road (SR 823) intersection, paralleling the South New River Canal and heading east into a residential suburban area, forming the border between Davie to the north and Cooper City to the south. At this point, Griffin Road fully enters Davie, and intersects with University Drive (SR 817) a half mile east of Pine Island Road. Griffin Road continues east through Davie, having an interchange with Florida's Turnpike (SR 91) before a curve dips slightly south and away from the paralleling canal. The road leaves Davie at the intersection with US 441/SR 7, entering a dense residential area of Hollywood. Griffin Road then enters Dania Beach, retaining the dense residential areas until the interchange with I-95. East of I-95, it forms the southern border of the Fort Lauderdale-Hollywood International Airport, with residential areas lining the road to the south as it approaches its eastern terminus at Federal Highway (US 1) at the southeastern end of the airport.

Major intersections

References

External links

818
818
818